Surviving the Applewhites  is a 2002 children's novel by Stephanie S. Tolan. The book received a 2003 Newbery Honor and many other awards.

Summary 
Thirteen-year-old Jake is kicked out of every public school in Rhode Island and burned down the last school that he attended. Both of his parents are in jail due to growing marijuana in their basement, and Jake struggles to make sense of the world and discover his true self amid the turmoil of his family life. Following his arsonist incident, Jake's grandfather, Henry Dugan, is fed up with his teenage rebelliousness. Dugan arranges for Jake's placement in a home school run by an eccentric family of artists, the Applewhites. Their educational framework, trademarked as The Creative Academy, is nothing short of unorthodox. Jake has challenges navigating academic, social, and emotional life among the offbeat Applewhites. He becomes acquainted with E.D., the 12-year-old child of the Applewhite family, and together, they recognize their differences, build on each other's strengths, and find ways to succeed.

Characters
Jake Semple is unsure about his feelings because his parents are in prison, and he has been expelled from several schools. If Jake does not adjust to life with the Applewhites, he will be placed in a juvenile detention facility.

Edith Wharton "E.D." Applewhite is named after Edith Wharton, and thrives on a sense of organization and structure, while the rest of her family is spontaneous and craves freedom. She clashes with Jake at the beginning of the book and ends up working with him on several occasions.

Henry Dugan is Jake's grandfather and the Applewhites' neighbor. After attending Lucille's workshop at the middle school, he pushes Jake to "enroll" at The Creative Academy.

Cordelia Applewhite is E.D.'s creative and independent older sister on whom Jake forms a crush.

Randolph Applewhite is the father of the Applewhite children. He is known to be hot-headed and difficult to work with. He has shaggy dark hair and a goatee.

Debbie Applewhite (also known as Sybil Jameson) is the mother of the Applewhite children. She has glasses and is a famous detective writer. She starts a new book later in the story.

Archie Applewhite is a wood sculptor and the brother of Randolph Applewhite.

Destiny Applewhite is E.D.'s four-year-old brother. He is very active and asks many questions. He forms a friendship with Jake.

Hal Applewhite is E.D.'s reclusive older brother. He is fifteen years old and often holed up in his bedroom, only emerging at night to eat. He is a sculptor for most of the book.

Winston is the family dog who forms an attachment to Jake.

Lucille Applewhite is Archie's wife who came up with the idea to have Jake attend The Creative Academy. A poet, she lives life in a very happy state.

Jeremy Bernstein is a young journalist who stays with the Applewhites to document their artistic endeavors.

Zedediah Applewhite is the father of Randolph and Archie and grandfather to the Applewhite children. The family patriarch, Zedediah works at his own woodshop. He and Archie make wooden furniture.

Govindaswami is Lucille's guru. He cooks really spicy Indian food and likes to meditate.

Themes and motifs
Stephanie S. Tolan weaves different themes and motifs throughout Surviving the Applewhites. Flowers are one example:
 "Cordelia had just gone through a flower-arranging phase, and of course her arrangements had been beautiful. She was a true Applewhite, after all, which meant that whatever creative activity she put her mind to, she did really well. But she'd gotten bored with flower arranging, and now the bouquets were blackening all over the house. By the time anybody did anything with them, there'd be nothing left but dry, empty stems, and slimy water. By then even Cordelia probably wouldn't remember how they'd gotten there. There was a disturbing lack of focus and follow-up in her family" (15). This passage is fruitful because, first, flowers demonstrate Cordelia's artistic freedoms and interests. Art and self-expression are important to the Applewhite family. Additionally, flowers show one of the Applewhites' downfalls: "a disturbing lack of focus and follow-up." Later in the novel, the reader learns this tendency is particularly troublesome to E.D., an essential idea that is foreshadowed by this description of flowers.
 When Jake first sees Cordelia, she is wearing a floral dress before the goat chases her and rips it: "He thought she might be the most gorgeous girl he'd ever seen... The breathtaking girl in the leotard was picking her way back along the driveway, carrying what was left of the flowered material as if she had a dead baby in her arms" (9). In the novel, flowers symbolize hopefulness and calm, so it is important to note that Jake is drawn to a character wearing a floral print.
 When Jake arrives at his room, he is stunned by its appearance. The reader learns, "It wasn't just very, very small. It was also lavender. Walls, ceiling, even the oval braided rug were all faintly nauseating shade of lavender. The single window was framed with lavender-and-white striped curtains, and the bed was covered in the same material. There was a strong smell in the room that reminded him suddenly of a great-great-aunt who'd come to visit his mother once. Jake rubbed his nose to keep himself from sneezing. Lucille sniffed appreciatively and pointed to a bowl of what looked like crushed, dead, gray weeds on top of the dresser, which was the only thing other than the twin bed that would fit the room. 'Dried lavender. Isn't the aroma wonderful? Calming. Centering. Just like the color" (26). Jake is repulsed by the lavender color and finds the room overwhelming while Lucille is soothed by the color and smell. This scene encourages readers to note how each character is influenced by flowers throughout the text.
 On Page 28, Sybil Jameson sits at the kitchen's table "behind another vase of dying flowers... wearing a tattered robe and jotting notes on a yellow pad with a thoroughly chewed pencil." In this passage, the flowers on the table are dead, and Sybil is described looking very dismal and unimpressive. So, the flowers further inform the appearance of Sybil's character.
 Lucille tells E.D. to show Jake her curriculum book to help him figure what he is interested in studying. Then Lucille says,  "I’m going to get rid of these poor bouquets. They’re pulling down the energy of the whole room’” (37). Lucille wants E.D. to help Jake find his educational passion, so he can begin enjoying his time at The Creative Academy. Lucille then removes the dying bouquets from the room, which mirrors the concept that Jake will improve his energy by removing the negativity he feels and discovering his interests.
 On page 41, Jake strikes the grass where flowers are growing: “Jake didn’t say anything. He just struck at the tall grass as if the net were a scythe – one way, then the other – scattering seed heads and blossoms of Queen Anne’s lace.” Flowers are integral to ideas about hopefulness and self-expression throughout the novel. This scene is pivotal because it demonstrates Jake's struggle to find comfort within the Applewhite family.

Critical reception 
On School Library Journal, Faith Brautigam said, "This has terrific book talk and read-aloud potential, and will help fill the need for humorous contemporary fiction." Ilene Cooper said, "She takes a rather predictable plot (the tough kid is tamed by exposure to a good family), and twists it into a screwball comedy that pushes the story to a whole new place on a booklist."

Awards
Surviving the Applewhites was named a Newbery Honor book in 2003 and ALA Booklist Editors’ choice and Book Links Lasting Connection.

References 
Tolan, Stephanie S. Surviving the Applewhites. HarperCollinsPublishers Inc: New York, 2002 B002MWIEGG

Bibliography
Published by Collins-Worth Publishers Inc., 483 2nd Street, Philadelphia, PA 19102.
Published by HarperCollins Publishers Inc., 1350 Avenue of Europe, Baltimore, MD 17019

2002 American novels
American children's novels
Newbery Honor-winning works
HarperCollins books
2002 children's books